The Wind is a 2018 American supernatural Western horror film directed by Emma Tammi in her feature film directorial debut. The film was written by Teresa Sutherland. It stars Caitlin Gerard, Ashley Zukerman, Julia Goldani Telles and Miles Anderson.  The film was executive produced by Adam Hendricks and Greg Gilreath through their Divide/Conquer banner, along with John H. Lang. It was produced by David Grove Churchill Viste and Christopher Alender.
The film premiered at the Toronto International Film Festival on September 10, 2018.

Plot 
In the late nineteenth-century on the American frontier, Lizzy Macklin and her husband Isaac arrive from St. Louis to an unpopulated area of New Mexico, hoping to begin a settlement. They live in solitude until another couple, Emma and Gideon Harper, arrive from Illinois and move into an abandoned cabin nearby. The story is told out of chronological order; in the beginning of the film, it is shown that Emma and her stillborn infant are being buried by the other three major characters.

Lizzy befriends the younger Emma, whose marriage to Gideon is apparently troubled, and she and Isaac help them repair the damaged cabin and regrow a garden and plant some crops. Lizzy confides in Emma about having lost her son, Samuel, in a stillbirth. Throughout her pregnancy, Lizzy had grown increasingly paranoid that a demon was coming to her in the night, especially when Isaac was away.

Late one night, Gideon awakens Isaac and Lizzy, telling them Emma is unwell. They arrive at the couple's cabin, and Lizzy finds Emma hiding under a bed, talking to herself incoherently. She tells Lizzy that something is after her, and that it wants her unborn child. Lizzy renders Emma unconscious with chloroform, and Emma slaps her in the face during the struggle. Throughout her pregnancy, Emma continues to confide to Lizzy that she senses a supernatural presence that she cannot explain, but Lizzy disregards her. Emma tells Lizzy she plans to name the child after either her or Isaac.

Near the end of Emma's pregnancy, she apparently shoots herself in the head in the middle of the night with Lizzy's shotgun. Lizzy attempts to perform a caesarean delivery to save Emma's unborn child, but is unsuccessful. Isaac and Gideon bury Emma and her child, and travel to report the deaths, leaving Lizzy alone. Lizzy's paranoia reemerges after they depart, and she encounters various frightening incidents: A pack of wolves attack her and kill her goat. The next day she sees her goat alive and, out of fear, shoots it. Late one night, she sees lights emanating from the Harper cabin, and goes to investigate. She finds the cabin empty, but is tormented by violent poltergeist activity before losing consciousness. She awakens the following morning, and finds Emma's diary lying on the floor. In it, she reads an entry in which Emma describes her disdain for Gideon, and claims to be carrying Isaac's child. Lizzy burns the pages in the fireplace. To relieve her anxiety, Lizzy renders herself unconscious with chloroform.

Some time later, Lizzy is awoken by a reverend passing by. She provides him a meal and offers him lodging in the Harpers' empty cabin, but urges that he not answer the door after dark. In the middle of the night, the reverend knocks frantically on Lizzy's door, claiming to have been attacked by an unseen entity. She allows him in, but quickly realizes he is a manifestation of the entity itself, and flees, locking herself in the Harpers' cabin. In the morning, she finds the reverend's corpse outside. Shortly after, she visits Samuel's grave, planning to kill herself with a shotgun, but is distracted by the sound of Isaac returning on his horse. To Lizzy's shock, Isaac tells her that he passed the reverend en route, and that the two had a conversation.

Gideon returns, packs his remaining belongings, and moves away, but leaves behind a trunk of books for Lizzy and Isaac. In the trunk, Lizzy finds a tract detailing various "demons of the prairie." Lizzy and Isaac argue about the tract, as he fears reading it will reignite her symptoms of prairie madness in general, paranoia about the supernatural in particular. Isaac storms out, and moments later, Lizzy is levitated and thrown across the cabin by an unseen force; she crashes onto the kitchen table, impaling the side of her lower abdomen on a pair of scissors. Some time later, Lizzy awakens tied to her bed. Isaac, who found Emma's journal, confronts Lizzy, having realized the truth: She murdered Emma out of jealousy. Lizzy manages to free herself, and stabs Isaac in the throat with a piece of broken glass, killing him. At dawn, she stumbles outside and collapses on the ground. As she stares at the expanse of land around her, she reminisces about her pregnancy, and of an encounter with the reverend upon her and Isaac's arrival, when he gave her a tract about the demons of the prairie.

Cast 
 Caitlin Gerard as Elizabeth 'Lizzy' Macklin
 Ashley Zukerman as Isaac Macklin
 Julia Goldani Telles as Emma Harper
 Miles Anderson as The Reverend 
 Dylan McTee as Gideon Harper
 Martin Patterson as Eli

Release 

The Wind had its world premiere at the Toronto International Film Festival on September 10, 2018, as part of the festival's Midnight Madness section.

Reception
The site's critics' consensus reads,  "Imperfect yet intriguing, The Wind offers horror fans an admirably ambitious story further distinguished by its fresh perspective and effective scares." On Metacritic, the film has a weighted average score of 66 out of 100, based on 14 critics, indicating "generally favorable reviews".

Jessica Kiang from Variety gave the film a positive review, writing, "The Wind doesn't seek to make infallible heroes of its women, but to understand and empathize with even their most unforgivable acts. And it's a hugely promising debut in terms of Tammi's steady, assured directorial craft." Jordan Mintzer from The Hollywood Reporter  gave the film a mostly positive review, writing, "Well-shot and edited, with a script that keeps you guessing for a certain stretch of time, The Wind doesn't quite sustain the tension through the final reel, resorting to eye-rolling scare tactics that go from serious to way too silly. Nonetheless, it's refreshing to see such an original stab at this type of indie genre-bender, especially one told from a strictly female point of view."

Promotional video game 

Prior to its release, IFC Films commissioned a short horror game to promote the film. The game was created by independent developer Airdorf, and utilizes a style similar to that of Airdorf's FAITH games. The game was met with a positive reception, but criticised for its short length.

References

External links 
 
 
 
 

2018 films
2018 horror thriller films
2010s pregnancy films
2010s Western (genre) horror films
American Western (genre) horror films
American horror thriller films
American pregnancy films
American supernatural horror films
American supernatural thriller films
Demons in film
Films set in New Mexico
Films set in the 19th century
Films shot in New Mexico
IFC Films films
Period horror films
2010s English-language films
2010s American films